Cristian Rivero may refer to:
 Cristian Rivero (actor) (born 1978), Peruvian actor
Cristian Rivero (footballer) (born 1998), Spanish footballer

See also
Cristian Riveros, (born 1982), a Paraguayan footballer